The Third Buddhist council was convened in about 250 BCE at Asokarama in Pataliputra, under the patronage of 3rd Emperor of India Ashoka The Great.

The traditional reason for convening the Third Buddhist Council is reported to have been to rid the Sangha of corruption in the form of enemies who in the guise of supporters had infiltrated the Sangha, as well as monks who held heretical views that is Mahasangika Sect of Buddhism (As per Ashoka's Perception). The council recommended the ruler Ashoka to expel sixty thousand Mahasangika spies as well as reevaluate the Pāli Canon.

It was presided over by the elder monk Moggaliputta-Tissa and one thousand monks participated in the Council. The council is recognized and known to both the Theravada and Mahayana schools, though its importance is central only to the Theravada.

Historical background 

The account of the background to the Third Council is as follows: Emperor Ashoka was crowned in the two hundred and eighteenth year after the Buddha's parinibbāna. At first he paid only token homage to the Dhamma and the Sangha and also supported members of other religious sects as his father had done before him. However, all this changed when he met the pious novice-monk Nigrodha who preached him Appamada-vagga verses from the Dhammapada. Thereafter he ceased supporting other religious groups and his interest in and devotion to the Dhamma deepened. He used his enormous wealth to build, it is said, eighty-four thousand pagodas and viharas and to lavishly support the bhikkhus (monks) with the four requisites. His son Mahinda and his daughter Sanghamitta were ordained and admitted to the Sangha.

Eventually, his generosity was to cause serious problems within the Sangha. In time the order was infiltrated by many unworthy men, holding heretical views and who were attracted to the order because of the Emperor's generous support and costly offerings of food, clothing, shelter and medicine. Large numbers of faithless, greedy men espousing wrong views tried to join the order but were deemed unfit for ordination.

 
Despite this they seized the chance to exploit the Emperor's generosity for their own ends and donned robes and joined the order without having been ordained properly. Consequently, respect for the Sangha diminished. When this came to light some of the genuine monks refused to hold the prescribed purification or Uposatha ceremony in the company of the corrupt, heretical monks.

When the Emperor heard about this he sought to rectify the situation and dispatched one of his ministers to the monks with the command that they perform the ceremony. However, the Emperor had given the minister no specific orders as to what means were to be used to carry out his command. The monks refused to obey and hold the ceremony in the company of their false and 'thieving' companions (Pali: theyya-sinivāsaka).

In desperation the angry minister advanced down the line of seated monks and drawing his sword, beheaded all of them one after the other until he came to the King's brother, Tissa who had been ordained. The horrified minister stopped the slaughter and fled the hall and reported back to the Emperor. Asoka was deeply grieved and upset by what had happened and blamed himself for the killings. He sought Thera Moggaliputta Tissa's counsel. He proposed that the heretical monks be expelled from the order and a third Council be convened immediately.

Council 

So it was that in the seventeenth year of the Emperor's reign the Third Council was called. Thera Moggaliputta Tissa headed the proceedings and chose one thousand monks from the sixty thousand participants for the traditional recitation of the Dhamma and the Vinaya, which went on for nine months. The Emperor himself questioned monks from a number of monasteries about the teachings of the Buddha. Those who held wrong views were exposed and expelled from the Sangha immediately. In this way the Bhikkhu Sangha was purged of heretics and bogus bhikkhus.

According to the Pali and Chinese accounts, the Elder Moggaliputta Tissa, in order to refute a number of heresies and ensure the Dhamma was kept pure, compiled a book during the council called the Kathavatthu. This book consists of twenty-three chapters, and is a collection of discussions on the points of controversy. It gives refutations of the 'heretical' views held by various Buddhist sects on matters philosophical. The Kathavatthu is the fifth of the seven books of the Abhidhamma Pitaka. However, the historicity of this has been questioned, as the account preserved in the San Jian Lu Pi Po Sho (Sudassanavinayavibhasha), although otherwise almost identical, does not mention the Kathavatthu.

Moggaliputtatissa told Ashoka that the doctrine taught by the Buddha was the Vibhajjavada, the Doctrine of Analysis. This term is used in various senses, and it is not clear exactly what it meant in this context. Traditionally, however, the Sri Lankan Theravadins and other mainland schools of Early Buddhism identified themselves as Vibhajjavada.

Emissaries 

One of the most significant achievements ascribed by Theravada tradition to this Dhamma assembly and one which was to bear fruit for centuries to come, was the Emperor's sending forth of monks, well versed in the Buddha's Dhamma and Vinaya who could recite all of it by heart, to teach it in nine different countries. According to the Mahavamsa (XII, 1st paragraph), he sent the following missionaries:

Results of missions

The Dhamma missions to Sri Lanka and Kashmir and Gandhara were very successful, leading to a long-term presence and dominance of Buddhism in those areas.

It is not clear exactly how influential the interactions to Egypt and Greece may have been, but some authors have commented that some level of syncretism between Hellenist thought and Buddhism may have started in Hellenic lands at that time. They have pointed to the presence of Buddhist communities in the Hellenistic world around that period, in particular in Alexandria (mentioned by Clement of Alexandria), and to the pre-Christian monastic order of the Therapeutae (possibly a deformation of the Pali word "Theravada"), who may have "almost entirely drawn (its) inspiration from the teaching and practices of Buddhist asceticism" (Robert Linssen).

Possibly Buddhist gravestones from the Ptolemaic period have also been found in Alexandria, decorated with what may be depictions of the Dharma wheel (W. W. Tarn, The Greeks in Bactria and India). Commenting on the presence of Buddhists in Alexandria, some scholars have even pointed out that “It was later in this very place that some of the most active centers of Christianity were established” (Robert Linssen "Zen living").

In the 2nd century CE, the Christian theologian Clement of Alexandria recognized Bactrian Buddhists (Sramanas) and Indian Gymnosophists for their influence on Greek thought:

"Thus philosophy, a thing of the highest utility, flourished in antiquity among the barbarians, shedding its light over the nations. And afterwards it came to Greece. First in its ranks were the prophets of the Egyptians; and the Chaldeans among the Assyrians; and the Druids among the Gauls; and the Sramanas among the Bactrians ("Σαρμαναίοι Βάκτρων"); and the philosophers of the Celts; and the Magi of the Persians, who foretold the Saviour's birth, and came into the land of Judaea guided by a star. The Indian gymnosophists are also in the number, and the other barbarian philosophers. And of these there are two classes, some of them called Sramanas ("Σαρμάναι"), and others Brahmins ("Βραφμαναι")." Clement of Alexandria The Stromata, or Miscellanies Book I, Chapter XV

See also
Buddhist councils
First Buddhist council
Second Buddhist council
Fourth Buddhist council
Fifth Buddhist council
Sixth Buddhist council
Pāli Canon
Sutta Pitaka
Vinaya Pitaka
Abhidhamma Pitaka
Greco-Buddhist monasticism
Buddhism and the Roman world
Kathavatthu (scripture composed during the Third Buddhist Council)
 Ancient Greece–Ancient India relations

References

External links
Account of the Third Council from the Mahavamsa

Buddhism in the ancient Mediterranean
Buddhist council3
Buddhist councils
250s BC
3rd-century BC Buddhism